Pradip Narayan Ghosh is an Indian physicist, and former Vice Chancellor of Jadavpur University and Dean of Science of prestigious Rajabazar Science College, University of Calcutta. He was born in Calcutta in 1948 and is son of Avarani and Asutosh Ghosh. His grandfather, Atul Krishna Ghosh was a distinguished lawyer and a political leader.          

He graduated from Presidency College, Calcutta and had Masters and doctorate degree from the Science College campus of University of Calcutta. He was a post M Sc research associate of Saha Institute of Nuclear Physics, Calcutta. He earned the Premchand Roychand Scholarship of the University of Calcutta. He joined Calcutta University as a Lecturer in Physics in 1971 at the age of 23. He has research contribution in the field of Atomic, Molecular and Laser Physics. He introduced the  Laser Physics and Application course in the University of Calcutta in the early nineteen eighties.

He  has   publications on Electromagnetically Induced Transparency. He developed an inexpensive model for laser cooling of atoms, the first such experimental work in a university in India. He was a participant in the European Commission sponsored International Collaborative Project Coherent Optical Sensors for Medical Applications (COSMA) involving nine countries of the world. He worked on this project at Sofia and Siena.

He was Research Scientist at Swiss Federal Institute of Technology (ETH), Zurich, Fellow of the Alexander von Humboldt Foundation at Ulm, Mainz, Konstanz, Freiburg and Koeln in Germany,  Senior Invitation Fellow of JSPS  in Japan and a visiting professor at Indiana University.

He published more than hundred and fifteen papers and three books:Laser Physics and Spectroscopy   published by Taylor and Francis, in 2018,  Physics with Cold Atoms'''  and Physics Applications'' 

As vice chancellor of Jadavpur University he established a School of Nuclear Sciences and began a post graduate course on Nuclear Engineering, the first such course in India. He took initiative to establish Jadavpur University Press, a publication centre of the University.

He received a Mother Teresa Lifetime Achievement Award  for contribution to education. He is former President of the Indian Physical Society and a founder member of the Indian Association of Physics Teachers.

References

Year of birth missing (living people)
Living people
Scholars from West Bengal